At the 1904 Summer Olympics, five fencing events were contested. The third edition of the Olympic fencing program included a team event (in men's foil) for the first time, as well as the only Olympic singlestick competition. Events for fencing professionals were eliminated. The competitions were held on September 7, 1904 and September 8, 1904.

Medal summary

Participating nations
A total of 11 fencers from 3 nations competed at the St. Louis Games:

Medal table

References

International Olympic Committee results database
Spalding's Athletic Almanac for 1905 (digitized copy online)

 
1904 Summer Olympics events
1904
1904 in fencing
International fencing competitions hosted by the United States